Cyd Gray CM (born 21 November 1976) is a former professional footballer from Trinidad and Tobago. He previously played as a defender for San Juan Jabloteh, as well as the islands' national team. He made his debut for the Soca Warriors against Costa Rica in 2001.

As a member of the Trinidad and Tobago squad that competed at the 2006 FIFA World Cup in Germany, Gray was awarded the Chaconia Medal (Gold Class), the second highest state decoration of Trinidad and Tobago.

References

External links
Bio at socawarriors.net

1976 births
Living people
Trinidad and Tobago footballers
Association football defenders
Trinidad and Tobago international footballers
2006 FIFA World Cup players
2002 CONCACAF Gold Cup players
2005 CONCACAF Gold Cup players
Joe Public F.C. players
San Juan Jabloteh F.C. players
TT Pro League players
Recipients of the Chaconia Medal